Calamagrostis nutkaensis is a species of grass known by the common names Pacific reedgrass and Nootka reedgrass.

It is native to western North America from Alaska to central California, where it is mainly a coastal species growing in moist areas such as beaches and wetlands. This is a perennial bunchgrass forming thick tufts of stems which may exceed a meter in height. There are several flat grass leaves up to a centimeter wide. The inflorescence is usually narrow and thin.

Coastal roadsides in Mendocino County, California can have populations, often receiving fog drip under Eucalyptus stands.

External links

 Jepson Manual Treatment - Calamagrostis nutkaensis
 USDA Plants Profile
 Calamagrostis nutkaensis - Photo gallery

nutkaensis
Bunchgrasses of North America
Native grasses of California
Grasses of the United States
Grasses of Canada
Flora of the West Coast of the United States
Flora of Alaska
Flora of British Columbia
Flora of Oregon
Flora of Washington (state)
Garden plants of North America
Flora without expected TNC conservation status